Götz Haydar Aly (born 3 May 1947) is a German journalist, historian and political scientist.

Life and career
Aly was born in Heidelberg, Baden-Württemberg. He is a patrilineal descendant of a Turkish convert to Christianity named  who was a chamberlain at the Prussian court in the late 1600s. By family tradition, the oldest son gets the middle name 'Haydar'.

After attending the Deutsche Journalistenschule, Aly studied history and political science in Berlin. As a journalist, he worked for the taz, the Berliner Zeitung and the FAZ. Active in the leftist German student movement in the late 60s and early 70s, he has published a polemic retrospective book Unser Kampf 1968: Ein irritierter Blick zurück (Fischer TB, Frankfurt/Main 2009) in which he argues the radical students of the time had more in common with the "1933 generation" than they realize.

He obtained his Habilitation in political science at the Free University of Berlin in 1994 with a dissertation on the Nazi euthanasia of disabled children. His interest in the subject was initially sparked when his infant daughter incurred severe permanent brain damage from a meningitis infection.
From 2004 to 2005, he was a visiting professor for interdisciplinary Holocaust research at the Fritz Bauer Institut in Frankfurt am Main, and 2012–13 at the Institute for Contemporary History at the University of Vienna. He has also been a visiting researcher at Yad Vashem.

Work
Aly researches the history of the Holocaust and the participation of social elites in Nazi destruction policies. In 2005 he gained public attention in Germany for the popular success of his book Hitlers Volksstaat (Hitler's People's State). In it, Aly characterises Nazi Germany as a "convenience dictatorship" that until late in World War II retained broad public support, in particular by making possible an unprecedented social mobility for the lower classes, by introducing redistributive fiscal policies and by greatly extending the German welfare state. Aly also recounts how all this was paid for in large part by confiscation of Jewish property in Germany and later the plunder of the conquered countries, and especially their Jewish populations. He maintains that the reason for the massive support the Nazi regime enjoyed among the German population was not so much a consequence of their violent anti-Semitism as their enjoying the fruits of the loot acquired by the Nazis in the occupied territories. He also shows how the Wehrmacht was directly involved in this mass plunder of the conquered populations and how in many cases it was the initiator of policies which led to confiscation and eventual extermination. His other point is that the conservative, non-Nazi financial state bureaucracy and the leading banks were crucial in formulating this policy of mass plunder and murder.

Also, in his book 'Final Solution': Nazi Population Policy and the Murder of the European Jews, Aly argues that those of lower rank influenced the leadership to the Final Solution. This approach is what is known as the bottom-up approach of the Holocaust.

Aly's views have not remained without criticism from the mainstream of historical research. Adam Tooze, in particular, rejected Aly's argumentation in detailed analysis published in the German press. Aly's work was awarded the Heinrich-Mann-Preis in 2002 and the Marion-Samuel-Preis one year later.

In a mixed review in The New York Times, historian Steven Zipperstein described Aly's book Europe Against the Jews as "densely documented" but lacking accuracy on events outside of Germany.

Publications
For an extensive list of Aly's publications and related web links in German, please refer to the German version of this article.

In English:
co-written with Peter Chroust & Christian Pross: Cleansing the Fatherland: Nazi Medicine and Racial Hygiene, Baltimore: Johns Hopkins University Press, 1994.
'Final Solution': Nazi Population Policy and the Murder of the European Jews, London: Arnold; New York: Oxford University Press, 1999.
co-written with Susanne Heim: Architects of Annihilation: Auschwitz and the Logic of Destruction, Princeton, NJ: Princeton University Press, 2002
co-written with : The Nazi Census: Identification and Control in the Third Reich, Philadelphia: Temple University Press, 2004.
translated by Jefferson Chase from the German Hitlers Volksstaat (see above): Hitler's Beneficiaries: Plunder, Racial War, and the Nazi Welfare State, New York: Henry Holt and Company, 2005.
Hitler's Beneficiaries: Plunder, Racial War, and the Nazi Welfare State, Metropolitan Books. January, 2007 , 
Why the Germans? Why the Jews? Envy, Race Hatred, and the Prehistory of the Holocaust, Metropolitan Books, April 2014, .
Europe Against the Jews, 1880–1945, Metropolitan Books, April 2020,

Awards 

 2007: National Jewish Book Award in the Holocaust category for Hitler's Beneficiaries: Plunder, Racial War, and the Nazi Welfare State
 2018: Geschwister-Scholl-Preis for Europa gegen die Juden, 1880–1945

References

External links

 How Germans Fell for the 'Feel-Good' Fuehrer, book review by Jody K. Biehl in Spiegel Online of March 22, 2005
 The logic of horror, an article by Götz Aly on the German "Historikerstreit" or historians' dispute
 Mahatma Gandhi was one of Nazis greatest friends claims Goetz Aly
Material in English on Adam Tooze debate in 2005 with Goetz Aly over his book Hitlers Volksstaat (Frankfurt 2005) at the University of Cambridge.
 An interview with Götz Aly, in Yad Vashem website.

1947 births
Living people
German people of Turkish descent
Writers from Heidelberg
German male journalists
German journalists
German newspaper journalists
20th-century German journalists	
21st-century German journalists
Historians of Nazism
Historians of the Holocaust
Free University of Berlin alumni
Heinrich Mann Prize winners
Recipients of the Cross of the Order of Merit of the Federal Republic of Germany
German male writers
20th-century German historians
21st-century German historians
Die Tageszeitung people
Frankfurter Allgemeine Zeitung people